Mordysh is a rural locality (a selo) in Pavlovskoye Rural Settlement, Suzdalsky District, Vladimir Oblast, Russia. The population was 545 as of 2010. There are 21 streets.

Geography 
Zapolitsy is the nearest rural locality.

References 

Rural localities in Suzdalsky District
Suzdalsky Uyezd